Candalides gilberti, the northern pencil-blue, is a species of butterfly of the family Lycaenidae. It is found in Australia in the Northern Territory and the north of Western Australia.

The wingspan is about 30 mm. Adults are blue. The underside of both sexes is white with rows of dark dots and dashes.

The larvae have been recorded feeding on Decaisnina signata and Alstonia actinophylla. They are narrow, green or red with various markings and have a length of about 15 mm. The colour depends on the part of the host plant it is feeding on (it is green when feeding on the leaves and red when feeding on the flowers). Pupation takes place in a mottled brown pupa with a length of about 14 mm.

References

Candalidini
Butterflies described in 1903
Butterflies of Australia